The 1999–2000 Djurgårdens IF Hockey season was the season in which the Swedish Djurgården ice hockey team finished first in the league, one point ahead of Brynäs. Djurgården was going to play rival Färjestad in quarterfinals. After a tough 7-game series Djurgården won and got to play Luleå and won pretty easily with a score of 3-0.
Then in the finals Djurgården played against Modo Hockey with the Sedin twins (Daniel Sedin and Henrik Sedin). Djurgården won 3-0 and became Swedish champions for the first time since 1991. It was also the season in which Djurgården's coach Hardy Nilsson created the new play called Torpedo hockey.

Playoffs

Player statistics

Regular season

Skaters Top-10
Note: GP = Games played; G = Goals; A = Assists; Pts = Points; +/- = Plus/Minus; PIM = Penalty Minutes;

Playoffs

Skaters Top-10

Note: GP = Games played; G = Goals; A = Assists; Pts = Points; +/- = Plus/Minus; PIM = Penalty Minutes;

External links
stats.swehockey

1999-2000
1999–2000 in Swedish ice hockey